FM302 is the debut solo extended play (EP) by Lee Hong-gi, the main vocalist of South Korean pop rock band F.T. Island. The EP and its title track " (Insensible)" were released at 12 a.m. KST on November 18, 2015, by FNC Entertainment.

Track listing
Track listing adapted from Naver Music.

Charts

References

2015 EPs
Lee Hong-gi albums
Korean-language EPs
FNC Entertainment EPs